GitKraken (formerly Axosoft) is a software company based in Scottsdale, Arizona. Founded in 2000, the company was purchased in 2020 by Resurgens Technology Partners, and changed its name from Axosoft to GitKraken in 2021.

GitKraken 

The company's eponymous product GitKraken is a suite of developer tools. The GitKraken Suite includes three tools: GitKraken Git GUI, a Git client available on Mac, Windows, and Linux, GitKraken Issue Boards, Kanban style boards, and GitKraken Timelines, an online timeline maker.

Axosoft 

The Axosoft (formerly OnTime) product is a proprietary project management and bug tracking system developed by GitKraken.

The system is available as hosted or on-premises software. The software allows project managers and developers to see each task, requirement, defect and incident in the system on individual filing cards through the Scrum planning board. Axosoft operates as a web application and can integrate with Microsoft Visual Studio and TortoiseSVN.

References

External links 
 

Axosoft
Axosoft